Habibie & Ainun is a 2012 Indonesian biographical drama film produced by Manoj Punjabi and Dhamoo Punjabi of MD Pictures. Starring Reza Rahadian, Bunga Citra Lestari and Tio Pakusadewo, the film is based on the memoir written by the 3rd President of the Republic of Indonesia, B. J. Habibie about his wife, Hasri Ainun Habibie, also named "Habibie and Ainun".

The film, released on 20 December 2012, drew the largest theatrical audience to date in Indonesian cinema history with 4.7 million viewers. It also became MD Pictures' highest grossing film produced to date.

The film was followed by a prequel, Rudy Habibie in 2016, with Rahadian reprising his role.

Plot
In 1953 at her school in Bandung, Hasri Ainun Besari is matched with Bacharuddin Jusuf "Rudy" Habibie for their intelligence, infatuating Rudy. In 1962, when accompanying his brother on an appointment, he meets Ainun, now a physician. They start showing love towards each other. Rudy reveals that after going back to Aachen for college, he will return to Indonesia to build his beloved country. He proposes her to be his wife, unable to promise luxury but eternal love. She accepts, and they marry and fly to Aachen.

While Rudy works at a train company, Ainun is pregnant. The couple move to Hamburg after the birth of their son, Ilham Akbar Habibie. After Rudy receives a Doctor of Engineering, he sends a permit letter to create an aircraft to the Indonesian Aircraft Industry Commando, but they are not ready to accept. Ainun cheers him up by revealing a second baby, Thareq Kemal Habibie. Ainun is revealed to have ovarian cancer, but does not tell Rudy. Missing the hospital environment, she reprises her role as a physician. Meanwhile, Ibnu Sutowo supports Rudy and flies him to Jakarta, where he has organized an aviation engineering team. At the same time, he becomes a minister. His blueprint of IPTN N-250 is approved by President Suharto, and manufacturing soon begins. Despite their sentiments calling it abnormal, the country's press rejoice at its maiden flight on 10 August 1995. The people of Indonesia also cheers at the takeoff via live broadcast.

Ainun asks Rudy to go on a honeymoon together, but is delayed when he takes oath to be the Vice President. As one, Rudy focuses more on his job, and becomes sleep deprived. Following the 1997 Asian financial crisis, as well as the May 1998 riots, Suharto resigns, and Rudy becomes President. Rudy orders for a wipeout of the New Order scars, but is criticized, and he is accused of corruption. Ainun learns that her cancer is worsening; she tells the nurse to not reveal this to Rudy. A year after serving, Rudy realizes that his presidency only burdens himself, and declares resignation. Following that, he revisits the N250, now abandoned due to the crisis, exacerbated with the public's apathy in its possibility of developing local mobility. They later go on the honeymoon.

Rudy discovers that Ainun's cancer reached Stage IV, prompting him to fly with his family to Munich, where Ainun is hospitalized at the Universitätsklinikum Großhadern. Although surgery is successful, the cells have divided and spread; Rudy still believes Ainun will be cured. Numerous surgeries are implemented, but the doctor says that cure is unguaranteed. Hopeless, Ainun's friend suggest that her funeral be organized; Rudy confronts her as it nears their marriage's 48th anniversary. Though Rudy remains firm on Ainun's discharge, she dies on 22 May 2010. He revisits Ainun's home, where he can still feel her spirit.

The film ends with a video of Habibie visiting Ainun's grave as he narrated that he will forever cherish memories with his sakinah love, Ainun.

Cast
 Bunga Citra Lestari as Hasri Ainun Habibie
 Reza Rahadian as B. J. Habibie
 Marsha Natika as young Ainun 
 Esa Sigit as young Habibie 
 Mike Lucock as Ilham Akbar Habibie
Christoffer Nelwan as Thareq Kemal Habibie
Ratna Riantiarno as R. A. Tuti Marini Puspowardojo
Tio Pakusadewo as Suharto

Release
This film was launched on 20 December 2012, with its first screenings attended by then-President of Republic of Indonesia Susilo Bambang Yudhoyono along with then-Governor of Jakarta, Joko Widodo as well as Habibie himself.

References

External links
 

2012 films
2010s Indonesian-language films
2010s German-language films
Films shot in Germany
Films shot in Indonesia
Love stories
Maya Award winners
Citra Award winners
Films set in 1953
Films set in 1962
2012 multilingual films
Indonesian multilingual films